The following served as executives of the Kentucky Colonels basketball team in the American Basketball Association from the league's founding in 1967 through its merger with the NBA in 1976.

 Jack Ankerson
 John Y. Brown, Jr.
 Alex Groza
 Gene Rhodes
 Adolph Rupp
 Mike Storen

American Basketball Association lists
Kentucky Colonels executives